The 2018 Liga de Elite was the 46th season of the Liga de Elite, the top Macanese league for association football clubs since its establishment in 1973. The season began on 19 January 2018 and ended on 1 July 2018.

League table

Fixtures and results

Round 1

Round 2

Round 3

Round 4

Round 5

Round 6

Round 7

Round 8

Round 9

Round 10

Round 11

Round 12

Round 13

Round 14

Round 15

Round 16

Round 17

Round 18 

Top Scorers:

William Gomes - Ka I - 38 Golos
Danilo Lins - CPK - 37 Golos
Diego Patriota - CPK - 24 Golos
Leonel Fernandes - Benfica - 20 Golos
Niki Torrão - Benfica - 19 Golos
Prince Aggreh - Sporting - 19 Golos
Tito Okello - Benfica - 11 Golos
Denilson - CPK - 11 Golos
Ronieli - Ching Fung - 10 Golos
Noronha Guterres - Monte Carlo 9 Golos

See also
2018 Taça de Macau

References

External links
Macau Football Association 

Campeonato da 1ª Divisão do Futebol seasons
Macau
1